The Vintage Camera Museum is a camera museum in Kampong Glam which is a neighbourhood and ethnic enclave in Singapore.

History and background 
Started by steel trader Solaiyappan Ramanathan and his cousin (and artist) A.P. Shreethar, the camera museum opened on 1 June 2017. It was started to educate people the evolution of camera. The exhibits consist of approximately 1,000 cameras from the personal collections of Ramanathan and Shreethar, who both collectively own 7,000 cameras. The cameras are from as far back as the late 19th century all the way to the early 2000s, and include pigeon camera, a Minox spy camera, and Rokuoh-sha Type 89 'Machine Gun' camera that was used by the Japanese as a training weapon during World War II.

The museum was affected by the onset of COVID-19 pandemic in Singapore which it saw a 90% drop in traffic, forcing it to be temporarily closed in 2020.

Architecture 
Ramanathan bought a building located at Jalan Kledek and retrofitted it. The façade of the building is shaped after a Rollei camera, and is thus called as the 'world's biggest camera-shaped building'. Housed in the  building are the Vintage Camera Museum, and Click Art Museum, which showcases Shreethar's artwork while allowing visitors to experiment photography with the art pieces.

The museum is housed in a white camera-shaped building with a total floor area of 2,500 square feet, divided into two museums – Vintage Camera Museum and Click art Museum.

See also 

 List of museums in Singapore

References

External links 

 

  

Technology museums in Singapore
Private collections in Asia
Museums established in 2017